Paracoryphella islandica is a species of sea slug, an aeolid nudibranch, a marine gastropod mollusk in the family Paracoryphellidae.

History of the taxonomy 
Paracoryphella islandica was originally described as Coryphella islandica by Nils Hjalmar Odhner in 1937. M. C. Miller (1971) assigned this species to a new genus Paracoryphella within a new family Paracoryphellidae. Gosliner & Kuzirian (1990) synonymized Paracoryphella with Flabellina, but Korshunova et al., 2017 reinstated Miller's genus and family.

References

Paracoryphellidae
Gastropods described in 1937